This is a list of Roman and Byzantine empresses. A Roman empress was a woman who was the wife of a Roman emperor, the ruler of the Roman Empire.

The Romans had no single term for the position: Latin and Greek titles such as augusta (Greek αὐγούστα, augoústa, the female form of the honorific augustus, a title derived from the name of the first emperor, Augustus), caesarea (Greek καισᾰ́ρειᾰ, kaisáreia, the female form of the honorific caesar, a title derived from the name of Julius Caesar), βᾰσῐ́λῐσσᾰ (basílissa, the female form of basileus), and αὐτοκράτειρα (autokráteira, Latin autocratrix, the female form of autocrator), were all used.

In the third century, augustae could also receive the titles of māter castrōrum "mother of the castra" and māter patriae "mother of the fatherland". Due to the practice of dividing the Roman empire under different emperors, there were periods when there were more than one Roman empress. All the Roman empresses are listed with some co-empresses. Not all empresses were titled augusta, and not all augustae were empresses since the emperor's female relatives or mistress could bear that title. Some caesarissas and despoinas that never were empresses are included, since the titles were quite similar to empress; however, in the Eastern Roman Empire these titles are often more equivalent to the modern term "crown princess".

Principate (27 BC – AD 284)

Julio-Claudian dynasty (27 BC – AD 68)

68–96: Year of the Four Emperors and Flavian dynasty

96–192: Nerva–Antonine dynasty

193–235: Year of the Five Emperors and Severan dynasty

235–284: Crisis of the Third Century

Dominate (284–476)

284–364: Tetrarchy and Constantinian dynasty

364–379: Valentinianic dynasty

379–395: Theodosian dynasty

Empress consorts of the Western Roman Empire

395–455: Theodosian dynasty

455–476: Non-dynastic

Empresses consort of the Eastern Roman Empire

395–457: Theodosian dynasty

457–518: Leonid dynasty

518–602: Justinian dynasty

602–610: Non-dynastic

610–711: Heraclian dynasty

711–717: Non-dynastic
None

717–802: Isaurian dynasty

802–813: Dynasty of Nikephoros I

813–820: Non-dynastic

820–867: Phrygian dynasty

867–1056: Macedonian dynasty

1057–1059: Komnenid dynasty

1059–1081: Doukid dynasty

1081–1185: Komnenid dynasty

1185–1204: Angelid dynasty

Empress consorts of the Eastern Roman Empire (in exile in Nicaea)

1204–1261: Laskarid dynasty

Empress consorts of the Eastern Roman Empire (restored)

1261–1453, restored to Constantinople: Palaiologan dynasty

Pretending Empress consorts of the Roman Empire

The Western Roman Empire met its end in 476 and the Eastern Roman Empire in 1453. Although others continued to claim similar titles after the Fall of Constantinople in 1453 – e.g. Holy Roman Empresses (as heirs of the Western Empire) or Russian Tsaritsas and Empresses (as the Empresses of the Third Rome) – the last reigning Empress consort of the Eastern Roman Empire of Constantinople was Maria of Trebizond. The last Palaiologan pretender, Andreas Palaiologos, sold his right to the imperial succession to Charles VIII of France, but he also willed the imperial titles to Ferdinand II of Aragon and Isabella I of Castille, and so in a sense either the French queens or the Spanish queens have been the titular Empresses of the Eastern Roman Empire since the 15th century. Another Palaiologian, Manuel Palaiologos, sold his right of succession to Ottoman Sultan Bayazid II (the Ottoman sultans already claim to be the Kaizer-i Rum or Roman emperors); but since there is no such thing as a sultaness because the Ottomans practiced polygamy, there are no Ottoman consorts. Other possible pretenders may be the former Queens of Greece because the Greek monarchy was mainly created in 1832 to be the successor of the Byzantine Empire. The former Queens of Italy could be another claimant since their husband's were one of the only European monarchs to effectively hold the city of Rome, the seat of the Roman Empire since its beginning.   
   
Neither the Empresses of Russia, the Queens of France, the Queens of Spain, the Queens of Italy or the Queens of the Hellenes claimed any sort of Roman titles and the claimants that clearly made the most point by using the word Roman in their title, the Holy Roman Empresses and the Queens of the Romans, ceased their claim upon the dissolution the empire in 1806. Currently the consorts of five of these states are pretenders in their own countries, themselves, and the current Queen of Spain claims no Roman titles. The status of the current pretenders to the Byzantine successor states of Trebizond, Epirus, and Nicaea are unclear much less their spouses; the despots of Morea became the Byzantine emperors (in exile) in 1453.

Along with the current Pretending Latin emperor, the pretenders of the crusader and client states within the Latin Empire are also unclear.

See also

 List of Augustae
 List of Russian consorts
 List of Latin Empresses of Constantinople
 List of Greek royal consorts
 List of Roman emperors
 List of Byzantine emperors

Notes

External links

Emp
Emp
Roman